Arthrobacter bambusae is a Gram-positive, aerobic and rod-shaped bacterium from the genus Arthrobacter which has been isolated from soil from a bamboo grove in Korea.

References

Further reading

External links
Type strain of Arthrobacter bambusae at BacDive -  the Bacterial Diversity Metadatabase

Bacteria described in 2014
Micrococcaceae